was a Japanese samurai clan leader of the Sengoku period. He had close relationship with Oda Nobunaga, one of the leading figures of the period. Terumune was the father of Date Masamune, who succeeded him as clan leader in 1584.

Biography
Terumune's childhood name was Hikotaro (彦太郎) later Sojiro (総次郎). He was born a warrior since his family is often in conflict with its neighbors.

In 1568, Terumune attacked Nihonmatsu Castle against Nihonmatsu Yoshitsugu, outnumbered and defeated, Yoshitsugu pretended to surrender.

In 1578, Terumune succeeded his father Harumune; and he became the sixteenth head of the Date clan of Mutsu Province.<ref>[https://books.google.com/books?id=msMcAQAAMAAJ&q=date+harumune&dq=date+harumune&hl=en&sa=X&ei=BSGyUcq8JLGw4APzhoCADA&ved=0CEUQ6AEwAw  "Date Terumune" at The Japan Biographical Encyclopedia & Who's Who, Issue 3 (1964), p. 121].</ref>

Records show that Nobunaga cultivated a close relationship with Terumune. The daimyo often confided in him affairs of the state through letters. During his campaigns unifying Japan, he sent Terumune a letter boasting how he annihilated tens of thousands in Echizen and Kaga.

When Oda Nobunaga was assassinated in 1582, Terumune gave his clan's support to Toyotomi Hideyoshi in the power struggle which followed.

An account cited him as party to the negotiation with a local rival called Hatakeyama Yoshitsugu. At this time, his son Date Masamune appear to be leading the clan. In 1585, Yoshitsugu was invited to a feast after an alliance was forged. A day after, when Masamune took the guest hunting, the latter's men abducted the undefended Terumune. Yoshitsugu stabbed Terumune to his death when he panicked as Masamune and his men caught up with him by the banks of the Abukuma River. A version of this account stated that Terumune was taken to the kidnapper's fort, where he was slain during Terumune's siege.

Family

 Father: Date Harumune
 Mother: Kubohime (1521-1594)
 Wife: Yoshihime (1548-1623)
Sister: Onamihime
 Children:
 Date Masamune by Yoshihime
 Date Masamichi (1568-1590) by Yoshihime
 Chikohime by Yoshihime
 Senshihime by Yoshihime

Retainers
Oniniwa Yoshinao
Date Sanemoto
Endō Motonobu
Shiroishi Munezane

In fiction
In NHK's 1987 Taiga drama Dokuganryū Masamune'', Terumune was played by Kin'ya Kitaōji.

References

Daimyo
1544 births
1585 deaths
Date clan
Deaths by firearm in Japan